Sir Joseph Aloysius Donatus Victoria, CBE was a British politician. He was one of the first elected members of the Senate of Ceylon.

He was appointed an Officer of the Order of the British Empire (OBE) in the 1945 Birthday Honours while serving as a Contractor in British India, a Commander of the Order (CBE) in 1948, and knighted in the 1950 Birthday Honours.

References

Members of the Senate of Ceylon
Ceylonese Commanders of the Order of the British Empire
Ceylonese Knights Bachelor
Alumni of St. Benedict's College, Colombo
Year of birth missing
Year of death missing
Sri Lankan expatriates in India